Thomas Elwood (died 1612), of Dover, Kent, was an English politician.

He was a Member of Parliament (MP) for Dover in 1593.

References

16th-century births
1612 deaths
Members of the Parliament of England for Dover
English MPs 1593